Frank Ryan (1 May 1932 – 28 May 2011) was  a former Australian rules footballer who played with Richmond in the Victorian Football League (VFL).

Notes

External links 
		

1932 births
2011 deaths
Australian rules footballers from Victoria (Australia)
Richmond Football Club players